Gyula Gál (born 18 August 1976 in Várpalota) is a retired Hungarian handball player.

He made his international debut on 15 March 1999 against France.

Gál suffered a torn knee ligament in April 2009 and since then he was struggling to fight back into the first team of MKB Veszprém KC and was also missing from the national team selection. To get more playing minutes and to win back his form, he was loaned to Tatabánya KC in October 2010.

However, this loan spell was cut short as he was signed by RK Zagreb in January 2010. The Croatian side was in need of a line player, as Frank Løke has been suspended for nine months by the European Handball Federation for signing a contract with both Skjern and Zagreb at the same time, and first choice pivot Igor Vori moved to HSV Hamburg during the summer transfer window. Gál's contract runs till June 2012.

Achievements
Nemzeti Bajnokság I:
Winner: 2000, 2002, 2003, 2004, 2005, 2006, 2008, 2009
Silver Medallist: 1998, 1999, 2001, 2007
Magyar Kupa:
Winner: 2001, 2002, 2003, 2004, 2005, 2007, 2009
Silver Medallist: 2006, 2008
Prva hrvatska rukometna liga:
Winner: 2010
Hrvatski rukometni kup:
Winner: 2010
EHF Champions League:
Semifinalist: 2002
Quarterfinalst: 2003, 2006
EHF Cup Winners' Cup:
Winner: 2008
Finalist: 2000
EHF Champions Trophy:
Finalist: 2002, 2008
Third Placed: 2000

Individual awards
 Hungarian Handballer of the Year: 2006

References

External links 
 Profile on RK Zagreb website
 Gyula Gál career statistics on Worldhandball.com 

1976 births
Living people
Hungarian male handball players
Olympic handball players of Hungary
Handball players at the 2004 Summer Olympics
People from Várpalota
Expatriate handball players
Hungarian expatriates in Croatia
Sportspeople from Veszprém County